Cyrille Eliezer-Vanerot (born August 1, 1996) is a French professional basketball player for Alliance Sport Alsace of the LNB Pro B.

Career 
Between 2010 and 2014, he attended INSEP, the French National Institute of Sport, expertise, and performance. In his final year at INSEP (2013–14), he averaged 12 points, 3.7 rebounds and 1.7 assists a game in the NM1, the third-tier of French basketball.

In 2014, Eliezer-Vanerot signed with Paris-Levallois Basket of the LNB Pro A.

International career 
He won silver at the 2012 European Championships with the French under-16 national team. He also played at the 2014 Albert-Schweitzer-Tournament, the 2014 U18 European Championships and the 2016 U20 European Championships.

Notes

External links 
 Profile at LNB.fr
 Profile at fiba.com

1996 births
Living people
ESSM Le Portel players
French men's basketball players
Metropolitans 92 players
People from Châtenay-Malabry
Small forwards
Sportspeople from Hauts-de-Seine
21st-century French people